Firidun Guliyev (born 25 June 1994) is an Azerbaijani weightlifter.

At the 2011 European Junior Championships Guliyev won the bronze medal in the 69 kg category, lifting 303 kg in total.
and a gold medal at the 2012 European Junior Championships.

At the 2013 Junior World Championships he won the bronze medal in the 69 kg category, lifting 308 kg in total.

He held a youth world record with a Clean & Jerk of 173 kg in the 69 kg division, but Clarence Cummings Jr. relinquished the record at the 2016 Junior World Championships with a Clean and Jerk of 180 kg.

References

External links
 
 Firidun Guliyev at Lift Up

1994 births
Living people
Azerbaijani male weightlifters
Azerbaijani sportspeople in doping cases
Doping cases in weightlifting